Clayton Allen Hensley (born August 31, 1979) is an American former professional baseball pitcher. Hensley has played in Major League Baseball for the San Diego Padres, Florida Marlins, and San Francisco Giants.

Early life
Hensley attended Lamar University in Beaumont, Texas, where he set a single season record with 127 strikeouts in 100 innings.

Professional career

San Francisco Giants
Hensley was drafted by the San Francisco Giants in the 8th round of the 2002 Major League Baseball draft.  On May 3, 2003, he pitched a perfect game for the South Atlantic League Hagerstown Suns.

San Diego Padres
On July 13, 2003, he was traded to the San Diego Padres for Matt Herges. On April 5, he was suspended 15 games for testing positive for steroids while pitching in the minor leagues. Later that season, he was called up from the Triple-A Portland Beavers. He emerged as a vital figure in middle relief, not allowing a home run in 47.2 innings.

In , Hensley made 29 starts for the San Diego Padres, with an ERA of 3.71.

Hensley began the  season as the Padres' #5 starter, but was placed on the disabled list in May.  After struggling in his minor league rehab starts, Hensley was optioned to the Triple-A Portland Beavers.

On August 4, 2007, Hensley gave up Barry Bonds' 755th career home run, which tied Bonds with Hank Aaron for most all-time. The next day, Hensley was optioned to the minor leagues.

Hensley was non-tendered by the Padres following the  season, making him a free agent.

Houston Astros
Hensley was signed by the Houston Astros on December 23, 2008, to a minor league contract with an invitation to spring training worth $550,000.

Florida Marlins
In May 2009, Hensley was released by the Astros and signed by the Florida Marlins.

In 2010, Hensley took over the closer role from Leo Núñez. For the start 2011 season, Hensley was once again being used as a setup man. However, after injury problems to both himself and Marlins ace Josh Johnson, the Marlins promoted him to the starting rotation.

Second stint with Giants
On January 26, 2012, he signed a non-guaranteed contract with the San Francisco Giants that included an invitation to Spring training. He was selected to join the Giants' 2012 Opening Day roster.

Cincinnati Reds
On February 11, 2013, he signed a minor league contract with the Cincinnati Reds. Hensley was released from the Reds Triple-A affiliate the Louisville Bats on May 20, thus becoming a free agent.

Milwaukee Brewers
On May 27, 2013, Hensley signed a minor league contract with the Milwaukee Brewers.  He was assigned to Triple-A Nashville. He became a free agent after the season.

Washington Nationals/Sugar Land Skeeters
Hensley signed a minor league deal with the Washington Nationals on January 24, 2014 but was released and signed with the Sugar Land Skeeters.

Retirement
Hensley retired from professional baseball on April 27, 2014.

Pitching style
Although Hensley lacked premium speed on his pitches, he used his upper-80s sinker to induce weak contact. To right-handed hitters, Hensley added a slider averaging about 80 mph and a big curveball averaging about 70 mph to the mix. To lefties, Hensley used the curveball and a changeup in the low 80s. He also occasionally threw a four-seam fastball. He delivered his pitches with a nearly straight-overhead throwing motion.

Personal life

, Hensley lives in Pearland with his fiancé.

References

External links

1979 births
Living people
Baseball players from Texas
Major League Baseball pitchers
Baseball players suspended for drug offenses
American sportspeople in doping cases
San Diego Padres players
Florida Marlins players
San Francisco Giants players
Lamar Cardinals baseball players
Salem-Keizer Volcanoes players
Hagerstown Suns players
San Jose Giants players
Lake Elsinore Storm players
Mobile BayBears players
Portland Beavers players
Round Rock Express players
Las Vegas 51s players
Louisville Bats players
Nashville Sounds players
Sugar Land Skeeters players
People from Pearland, Texas
Sportspeople from Harris County, Texas
Toros del Este players
American expatriate baseball players in the Dominican Republic